"Tell Me" is a 1998 song by British singer Billie Myers, released as the second single from her debut album, Growing, Pains. It reached number 28 on the UK charts, which compared to her previous single was a commercial failure.

Critical reception
Larry Flick from Billboard wrote that the song "has a stompin' alterna-rock attack that allows Myers to flex her quivering, melodramatic vocal style to maximum effect." He added further that producer Desmond Child's "pop savvy is evident in a mix that counters the forceful guitar/drum execution with cushiony keyboards and a spree of fluttering sitar lines. Holding everything together is a sticky chorus that picks up to an anthemic pace by the track's close. In fact, it's easy to see a sea of punters chanting and punching the air in unison during a live performance of this hit-bound gem." Gerald Martinez from New Sunday Times described it as "a whimsical song where she imagines she is the person making love to her."

Versions
 LP Version - 5:04
 Radio Edit (LP Edit) - 4:03
 Alternative Radio Remix - 6:31
 Alternative Radio Edit - 3:46
 Victor Calderone Club Mix - 7:39 (promo)

Charts

References

1998 singles
1997 songs
Universal Records singles
Songs written by Billie Myers